KemperSports is a privately held golf course and hospitality management company founded in 1978 by Steven H. Lesnik and James S. Kemper, Jr., president and chairman of the board of Kemper Insurance. The company began with the management of Kemper Lakes Golf Club in Kildeer, Illinois (United States), an upscale public golf course in the Chicago area.

Based in Northbrook, Ill., KemperSports builds, owns and manages golf courses, resorts, athletic clubs, lodging venues and restaurants, and has more than 5,500 employees. Its clients include owners and developers of golf courses and hospitality venues, financial institutions and municipalities. Today, the company’s management portfolio includes Bandon Dunes Golf Resort, titled the No. 1 Golf Resort in North America by Golf Digest and GOLF magazine; The Glen Club; Desert Willow Golf Resort; Harbor Shores, site of the 2012 and 2014 Senior PGA Championship presented by KitchenAid; and Chambers Bay, host of the 2010 U.S. Amateur and the 2015 U.S. Open.

In 2012, the company launched a private club division called KemperCollection. KemperSports was named the Club Management Company of the Year in 2012 by BoardRoom magazine. The company is led by CEO Steven K. Skinner and President Josh W. Lesnik, son of chairman and co-founder Steven H. Lesnik.

References

External links
 

Sports in Cook County, Illinois
Golf in Illinois
Hospitality companies of the United States